Xeros may refer to:
 Denizli, Cyprus, a village in Cyprus, the Greek name of which is Xeros
 Amietophrynus xeros, the subdesert toad, a species of toad in the family Bufonidae

See also
 Xero (disambiguation)